Anastasia Bucsis (born 30 April 1989) is a Canadian former speed skater. She competed at the 2010 Winter Olympics in Vancouver in the women's 500-metre competition. In addition, she participated in the Sochi 2014 Winter Olympics for women's long track, placing 27th in the 500 metres. She now is a sportscaster and personality for CBC. Bucsis lives in Toronto, and is a passionate advocate for mental health issues, eradicating homophobia in sport, and telling the stories of athletes.

Athletic career
At the University of Calgary, Bucsis studied Communications and Culture, while earning the chance to represent Canada in speed skating at the 2009 Winter Universiade. She qualified for the 2010 Olympic Winter Games at the age of 20. Starting in 2011, she made three consecutive appearances at the ISU World Single Distances Championships.

On 10 April 2017, Bucsis retired from speed skating after a serious knee injury.

Professional career 
Bucsis is now a sportscaster and works for CBC. She has hosted digital shows for CBC during the Tokyo 2020 Olympics as well as the Beijing 2022 Winter Olympics. She launched and hosts "Player's Own Voice - The Podcast" in 2018. She hosts on multiple platforms for the network.

Personal life
Bucsis publicly came out as gay in 2013 at Calgary Pride. She came out publicly in opposition of Russian anti-LGBTQ laws. She was the only athlete from North America to do so, and garnered media attention.  Bucsis also marched in the 2014 Calgary Pride Parade. She has done extensive work within the LGBTQ community to combat homophobia in sport. She is also an advocate for mental health, after having struggled with anxiety and depression. In 2014 she appeared in the documentary film To Russia with Love.

In June 2014, it was revealed that Bucsis used to be in a relationship with women's hockey goaltender and four-time Winter Games gold medalist Charline Labonté.

Bucsis now works for CBC Sports and hosts the podcast, "Players Own Voice". She has been CBC's Long Track speed skating analyst since 2018. In 2019, she appeared in Standing on the Line, a documentary film about homophobia in sports by Paul-Émile d'Entremont.

Awards and honors
2007 Canada Winter Games, Silver, 500 metre speed skating

References

External links
 
 
 

1989 births
Living people
Canadian female speed skaters
Lesbian sportswomen
Canadian LGBT sportspeople
Olympic speed skaters of Canada
Speed skaters at the 2010 Winter Olympics
Speed skaters at the 2014 Winter Olympics
Speed skaters from Calgary
LGBT speed skaters
21st-century Canadian LGBT people
21st-century Canadian women